Reece James William Topley (born 21 February 1994) is an English international cricketer who plays for the England cricket team in white ball cricket as a left-arm fast medium bowler. He plays for Surrey in domestic cricket. Topley debuted for England in August 2015 against Australia. Topley was named in England's ICC Men's T20 World Cup 2022 squad.

Background
He was born on 21 February 1994 in Ipswich. He was educated at the Royal Hospital School. His father, Don Topley, was a first-class cricketer for Essex and Surrey. His father was also one of his teachers at Royal Hospital School, where he is a master of cricket. His uncle, Peter Topley, was also a first-class cricketer.

Domestic and franchise career
In June 2009, aged 15, Topley made the headlines when he was injured bowling in the nets at Loughborough University to England batsman Kevin Pietersen. Pietersen flat drove a delivery, which ended up striking Topley on the side of the head, knocking him to the ground. He was taken to Leicester Royal Infirmary where he required stitches to his ear and was kept in hospital overnight. Following the incident, Pietersen, whom Topley cited as his favourite player, gave the youngster his cricket bat with his signature on.

A product of the Essex youth cricket system, Topley made his first-class debut for Essex against Cambridge MCCU in the 2011 season. He impressed on County Championship debut against Kent, taking his maiden five wicket haul when he took figures of 5/46 in Kent's second-innings of the match. In the following championship match against Middlesex he his second five wicket haul, with figures of 5/64 in Middlesex's first-innings. In May 2011, he signed a one-year professional contract with Essex. That month also saw Topley make his List A debut against the Unicorns in the Clydesdale Bank 40, with Topley claiming his maiden wicket in that format, that of Robin Lett.

Mid-season Topley took a break from county cricket to return to Royal Hospital School to revise for his summer exams. However, during his break he was called up to play for England Under-19s for their Youth One Day International series against South Africa Under-19s. He returned to action for Essex in August, to date he has played two List A matches and nine first-class matches. He has made a good start to his first-class career, taking to date 34 wickets at an average of 23.55. The start to his career drew praise from former England captain Michael Vaughan, who stated that Topley could become a future Test cricketer.

On 1 September 2015, Hampshire County Cricket Club confirmed the signing of Topley from Essex at the end of the 2015 season. At the end of the 2018 season and yet another stress fracture, Topley underwent back surgery.

In IPL 2021, he was asked for being  a replacement for injured Josh Hazlewood by Chennai Super Kings,  but he denied the offer as the cricketer feared by the hike of COVID-19 cases in India. In 2021, he was drafted by Oval Invincibles for the inaugural season of The Hundred. In December 2021, he was signed by Islamabad United following the players' draft for the 2022 Pakistan Super League.

In April 2022, he was bought by the Oval Invincibles for the 2022 season of The Hundred.

He is bought by Royal Challengers Bangalore to play in the IPL 2023 season for INR. 1.90 Crore in the IPL auction held on 23 December 2022.

International career

He made his Twenty20 International debut against Australia on 31 August 2015 and his One Day International debut, also against Australia, on 13 September 2015, taking figures of 0-33.

He kept his place in the ODI side for the series against Pakistan and played in all four matches. He picked up his first international wickets in the first match and finished with figures of 3-26, although it wasn't enough to prevent an England defeat. He had picked up one wicket in each of the next three matches, with England winning all three games. He played in the 1st T20 international between the two sides, and finished with figures of 3-24.

He continued his role in the ODI side for the tour of South Africa, and again played every game in the series. He took figures of 1–43 in the first game, as England won by 39 runs on the DL Method. In the next game he took figures of 4–50 to help England to back to back wins. England lost the next three games of the series, although Topley performed well, taking figures of 2–39 in the fourth match of the series and 3–41 in the final match, which South Africa won by 5 wickets. He played in both T20 internationals, although he didn't take a wicket in either game.

He kept his place in the England side for the T20 World Cup, but was expensive in the first game against the West Indies, taking figures of 1–22 in 2.1 overs. He was expensive in the next match against South Africa, bowling two overs for 33 runs. He was replaced in the side by Liam Plunkett and did not play in the tournament again. Topley was part of that successful T20 squad that was defeated in the World Cup Final in India, but upon returning home was found to have a stress fracture in his back.

On 29 May 2020, Topley was named in a 55-man group of players to begin training ahead of international fixtures starting in England following the COVID-19 pandemic. On 9 July 2020, Topley was included in England's 24-man squad to start training behind closed doors for the ODI series against Ireland. On 27 July 2020, Topley was named in England's squad for the ODI series.

On 26 March 2021, Topley returned to the England starting XI in the second ODI against India at Pune. He took 2-50 from 8 overs. In October 2021, Topley was added to England's squad for the 2021 ICC Men's T20 World Cup as a travelling reserve.

On 14 July 2022, in the second match against India, Topley took his first five-wicket haul and the best bowling figures for England in an ODI match with 6 for 24.

References

External links 

1994 births
Living people
Cricketers from Ipswich
Durban's Super Giants cricketers
England One Day International cricketers
England Twenty20 International cricketers
English cricketers
Essex cricketers
Hampshire cricketers
Melbourne Renegades cricketers
Oval Invincibles cricketers
People educated at the Royal Hospital School
Surrey cricketers
Sussex cricketers